Francesco I d'Este (6 September 1610 – 14 October 1658) was Duke of Modena and Reggio from 1629 until his death. The eldest son of Alfonso III d'Este, he became reigning duke after his father's abdication.

Biography
The pestilence of 1630–1631 killed 70% of Modena's inhabitants. After the outbreak of the Thirty Years' War he sided with Spain and invaded the duchy of Parma, but upon visiting to Spain to claim his reward, he could only acquire Correggio by a payment of 230,000 florins.

Later followed the First War of Castro, in which Francesco's Modena joined Venice and Florence and sided with the Dukes of Parma against Barberini Pope Urban VIII, aiming to reconquer Ferrara. The war ended without any particular gain for the Modenese. As again no help had come from Spain, Francesco allied with France through the intercession of Cardinal Mazarin. When he however failed to conquer Cremona, and as the situation of the Thirty Years' War seemed to be favourable for Spain, the Duke sought for an agreement with the latter. He returned to the service of France by marrying his son and heir Alfonso to Laura Martinozzi, Mazarin's niece.

After successful resistance to a Spanish invasion from their territories in Milan, he fought alongside France and Savoy, conquering Alessandria and Valenza in 1656–1657 with the help of his son. In 1658 he conquered Mortara but, struck by malaria, died in Santhià soon later. After Maria's death in 1646, he married her sister Vittoria Farnese who died 1649.

His last marriage was to Lucrezia Barberini (1628–1699), daughter of Taddeo Barberini with whom his troops had fought during the First War of Castro. He had a total of eleven children, two of them, Alfonso and Rinaldo, were later Dukes of Modena.

Although a skillful military commander, Francesco was renowned for his upright character and religious ideals. He enriched Modena with the construction of the Ducal Palace of Modena, the large Teatro della Spelta, the Villa delle Pentetorri, a port on an enlarged Naviglio channel and the restoration of the Cittadella.

Francesco in Art
Francesco was immortalized by Bernini in a sculpture made around 1650–1651 (Este Gallery and Museum, Modena). It culminates the master sculptor's revolution in portraiture. Much of the freedom and spontaneity of the bust of Cardinal Scipione Borghese is kept, but it is united with a heroic pomp and grandiose movement that portray the ideals of the Baroque age as much as the man. This style of sculpting would later also be seen in the bust of Louis XIV. According to Howard Hibbard, Bernini's portrait bust of Francesco I and the Louis XIV bust "set the standard for monarchical portraiture up to the time of the French Revolution" (126-8).

References

Issue

Issue with Maria Caterina Farnese:

Alfonso d'Este, Hereditary Prince of Modena (1632), died in infancy.
Alfonso IV d'Este, Duke of Modena (2 February 1634 – 16 July 1662), married Laura Martinozzi, parents of Mary of Modena.
Isabella d'Este (3 October 1635 – 21 August 1666) married Ranuccio II Farnese, Duke of Parma, and had issue.
Eleonora d'Este (1639–1640), died in infancy.
Tedaldo d'Este' (1640–1643), died in infancy.
Almerigo d'Este (8 May 1641 – 14 November 1660), died young.
Eleonora d'Este (2 January 1643 – 24 February 1722), a nun.
Maria d'Este (8 December 1644 – 20 August 1684), married Ranuccio II Farnese, Duke of Parma, and had issue.
Tedaldo d'Este (1646), died in infancy.

Issue with Vittoria Farnese:
Vittoria d'Este (24 August 1649 – 1656).

Issue with Lucrezia Barberini:
Rinaldo d'Este, Duke of Modena (26 April 1655 – 26 October 1737), married Duchess Charlotte Felicitas of Brunswick-Lüneburg and had issue.

Ancestry

External links

https://web.archive.org/web/20091015021941/http://worldroots.com/foundation/families/taddeobarberinidesc.htm

 -- (the record of the festival celebrating Francesco's marriage to Lucrezia Barberini)

1610 births
1658 deaths
Francesco 1
Francesco 1
Francesco 1
17th-century Italian nobility
Knights of the Golden Fleece
Hereditary Princes of Modena
Francesco 1